Captain Rogers may refer to:
 Captain Woodes Rogers, an English sea captain, privateer, and the first Royal Governor of the Bahamas
 Captain William C. Rogers III, a former officer in the United States Navy
 Captain Robert Rogers (soldier), an American frontiersman given the rank of Captain during the French and Indian War whilst commanding a force of colonial Rangers
 Captain Moses Rogers, captain of the SS Savannah during her historic crossing of the Atlantic Ocean in 1819
 Captain W.G. Rogers, captain of the SS John B. Cowle when she sank in 1909
 Captain Charles Warrington Rogers, namesake for Rogers, Arkansas

Fictional characters
 Captain Steve Rogers, AKA Captain America a Marvel Comics superhero
 Captain Buck Rogers, a science fiction character in magazines and other serials
 "Captain Rogers", a short story in W. W. Jacobs' work, The Lady of the Barge